Troubled Times is the fifth album by the English band Cast, released digitally on 2 November 2011. It is the first album they recorded since reuniting in 2010 for shows celebrating the 15th anniversary of their debut, All Change. It is also the last album recorded with founding bassist Pete Wilkinson, who left the band in 2014.

Background
Nearly a decade after Cast split up shortly after the release of their fourth album Beetroot, lead singer and songwriter John Power had already released three solo albums when he started writing material that he felt was more suited to the band. After spending the years since the split shying away from Cast's music, Power decided it was time to play the songs again, especially with debut album All Change'''s impending 15th anniversary. He then got in touch with the other band members: guitarist Liam "Skin" Tyson, bassist Pete Wilkinson and drummer Keith O'Neill. Following the All Change 15th Anniversary Tour around the U.K. in November and December 2010, the band started work on the new album with fans helping to fund the recording through PledgeMusic, with a percentage of the profits donated to the charity Shelter.

Recording
Cast began recording at Real World Studios on 3 May 2011 under the supervision of John Leckie, who had previously produced the band's first two albums, All Change and Mother Nature Calls. Keith O'Neill was absent from the album sessions due to his work as a tour manager. As a result, the album features drumming by Steve Pilgrim, who had played in Power's solo band and would also fill in for O'Neill on Cast tours since the band's reformation. Tracking on the album was completed in September 2011, with Power taking time off in July due to having a baby.

Days after mastering was complete, the album was released digitally on 2 November 2011 to fans who had helped fund the album through PledgeMusic. Troubled Times was finally released physically on 5 March 2012, with two bonus tracks.

Reception

Jamie Atkins of Record Collector'' was critical of Power being "keen to inform the world that things these days are vaguely not 'alright without substantiating as to why, using his "undoubted talent to produce abstract, clichéd drivel to hammer this point home".

Track listing
All songs written by John Power.

Bonus tracks

Personnel
Cast
 John Power – acoustic guitars, vocals
 Liam "Skin" Tyson – electric guitars, 12-string acoustic, lap steel, slide guitar, backing vocals
 Peter Wilkinson – bass guitar, backing vocals
 Keith O'Neill – drums (did not play on the album)

Additional musician
 Steve Pilgrim – drums

Production
 John Leckie - producer, engineer, mixing
 Paul Hemmings - producer (tracks 13 and 14)

References

Cast (band) albums
2011 albums
Albums produced by John Leckie